Kyari Magumeri also known as Chari Maigumeri (c. 1897 – ?) was a Nigerian soldier who fought in both World Wars. During the Great War, Magumeri served in the German Army. He received an Iron Cross medal but was later captured in Garua. After his release, he joined the Nigerian regiment and fought on the British side. He retired in 1953 and was given the honorary title of Captain.

Life
Maigumeri was from Borno State. In 1913, he crossed the border to Northern Cameroons and joined the German forces fighting Britain during World War I. In 1915, he was awarded the Iron Cross (2nd class) medal for his efforts in fighting through a British ambush upon the death of his German officer. Maigumeri was soon captured by the British in Garua and was taken to a prisoner of war camp. Upon his release in 1917, he offered to join the Nigeria Regiment. He was accepted by the British and after training, he was posted to the 3rd Battalion. He was given the rank of sergeant in 1920 and Company sergeant major in 1924. Just before the  Aba Women’s Riot in 1929, he was given the rank of Regimental sergeant major. 

During World War II, Maigumeri was posted to East Africa and then North Africa. He saw the capture of Mogadishu and fought through the Abyssinian campaign. After the defeat of Italy, his battalion was posted to Sierra Leone where he met Nigerian recruits such as General Ironsi. When his battalion was merged with the 81st and 82nd (West Africa) Division, he followed them to the Burma Campaign. In 1945, after the end of the war, he represented the 3rd Battalion in a victory parade in London and was awarded the British Empire Medal. He retired in 1953 as an honorary Captain in the Nigeria regiment. He was the first non-commissioned officer to be given the rank of Captaincy in British West Africa.

Notes

References

Nigerian Army officers
People from Borno State
Kanuri people